

Events
January – The 1990 Commonwealth Games in Auckland, New Zealand are broadcast on Seven Network.
27 January – Australian longest running children's Saturday morning series Saturday Disney along with music video programme Video Smash Hits debut on Seven Network.
29 January – Welsh children's animated series Fireman Sam premieres on ABC.
29 January – Australian television and radio host Steve Vizard presents his very own national Tonight show titled Tonight Live with Steve Vizard which is shown five nights a week on Seven Network.
3 February – Paul Keane was ready to get axed from his long-running role as Des Clarke in Neighbours, but has instead opted to take a four-month hiatus and was expected to return in April. Keane's break from the show comes as cast morale is at an all-time low following the departure of several key cast members, but producers are confident that Des will return with some good storylines.
12 February – American children's animated series Teenage Mutant Ninja Turtles debuts on Seven Network.
13 February – ABC debuts a new current affairs program Lateline hosted by Kerry O'Brien.
16 February – Australian lifestyle and gardening series Gardening Australia debuts on ABC.
20 February – In Neighbours, Toby & Noelene Mangel depart.
23 February – In Neighbours, this was Bronwyn Davies' final episode.
28 February – In Neighbours, this was Hilary Robinson's final episode.
31 March – Neighbours Producers have chosen to write out the popular character of Sharon Davies – the on-screen sister to Rachel Friend's former character Bronwyn Davies, played by 19-year-old Jessica Muschamp said the exit of Neighbours may have been a "blessing in disguise." She finished her final credits in Neighbours in five weeks and after leaving the series, she went to English pantomime performances over Christmas and was considering mini-series and theatre roles in Australia.
April – Jennifer Keyte becomes the first solo woman newsreader on a commercial network in Australia when Glenn Taylor leaves the Melbourne bureau of Seven News.
9 June – Neighbours star Linda Hartley has decided to leave the hit-turned-troubled 10 TV Australia soap opera after a behind-the-scenes battle between producers Grundy Television and 10 TV Australia. Hartley had requested for a hiatus from the series to allow time to travel overseas and to pursue an opportunity for a singing career including a recording contract with Sony Music Australia, but Grundys were not keen to renew her contract, claiming the show had exceeded its casting budget. However, budget cuts ran out, negotiations broke down again and Hartley has chosen to leave the series.
2 July – Canadian children's animated series Babar based on a series of children's books by Jean and Laurent de Brunhoff premieres on ABC.
15 July – After a long absence of six months, the Australian comedy series The Comedy Company returns on 10 TV Australia.
20 August - French children's animated series Bouli premieres on ABC.
3 September – Australian children's TV series Johnson and Friends debuts on ABC.
5 September – In Neighbours, this was Beverly Robinson's final episode.
7 September – In Neighbours Kerry Mangel was shot in the head while duck hunting by Mick Taylor, leaving Joe Mangel in Saw-styled screaming and crying. This was the final episode.
10 October – In Neighbours, this was Des Clarke's final episode.
9 November – Cartoon All-Stars to the Rescue, the American animated special program that warns children the danger of drugs and features famous cartoon characters from various animated TV shows alike, is simultaneously simulcast by Seven Network, Nine Network and 10 TV Australia (thus airing on all three major commercial television stations). The program was also introduced by Prime Minister Bob Hawke and his wife Hazel.
11 November – Australian comedy series The Comedy Company airs its final episode on 10 TV Australia before getting axed after very bad ratings and a failure to match the success of its 1988 season.
12 November – Australian children's TV series Johnson and Friends begins a second run and first ever repeat on ABC when it starts airing in the afternoons for the very first time ever. The series will be shown at 3:55 pm (which is usually the timeslot for airing 5 minute programmes for children) dominating the 5 minute programming thus making Play School screening at 4:05 pm and the 4:30 pm programmes to push forward to 4:35 pm.
16 November – Hey Hey It's Saturday'''s Red Symons marries Elly Agotis in Melbourne in a Greek ceremony.
December – The Seven Network wins the 1990 ratings year with a record of 35.6% share for Total People. The most watched program was Seven's AFL: 1990 AFL Grand Final.
8 December – Neighbours producers have announced that star Ashley Paske will not renew his contract with the troubled 10 TV Australia soap opera when it expires in January. He is expected to be seen on-air until May.
9 December – 1990 Neighbours movie-length finale: Joe Mangel shakes and kidnaps Sky Bishop from Eric Jensen (episode 1), Joe & Toby Mangel are arrested for shoplifting and kidnapping Sky Bishop, Tom Ramsay returns to Rsmsay Street after a three-and-a-half year absence (episode 2), Paul Robinson proposes to Christina Aleesi, Glen Donnolly arrives and tells that Jim Robinson is his father (episode 3).
21 December – James Valentine presents the Australian weekday afternoon magazine series The Afternoon Show for the last time at 5:00 pm on ABC. The programme includes reruns of the French-American-Canadian animated series Inspector Gadget and Canadian action drama series Danger Bay (Both these shows haven't been airing on the ABC for a long time since most of the year).
22 December – Neighbours star Richard Norton has been informed by producers that they won't be renewing his contract with the troubled 10 TV Australia soap opera when it expires in February.
24 December – American animated special program Cartoon All-Stars to the Rescue gets repeated and airs for a second time airing on both Seven Network, Nine Network and 10 TV Australia once again.
31 December – Queensland becomes the second Aggregated market with local stations Sunshine Television (which now is Seven Queensland), WIN and QTV (in 2002 it became Southern Cross Ten, in 2016 it became Southern Cross Nine, now 10 Regional).

Premieres

Domestic series

International series

Changes to network affiliation
This is a list of programs which made their premiere on an Australian television network that had previously premiered on another Australian television network. The networks involved in the switch of allegiances are predominantly both free-to-air networks or both subscription television networks. Programs that have their free-to-air/subscription television premiere, after previously premiering on the opposite platform (free-to air to subscription/subscription to free-to air) are not included. In some cases, programs may still air on the original television network. This occurs predominantly with programs shared between subscription television networks.

Domestic

International

Television shows
1950s
 Mr. Squiggle and Friends (1959–1999)

1960s
 Four Corners (1961–present)

1970s
 Hey Hey It's Saturday (1971–1999)
 A Current Affair (1971–1978, 1988–2005, 2006–present)
 The Midday Show (1973–1998)
 60 Minutes (1979–present)

1980s
 Sale of the Century (1980–2001)
 Sunday (1981–2008)
 Wheel of Fortune (1981–1996, 1996–2003, 2004-beyond)
 Today (1982–present)
 Neighbours (1985–1990)
 The Flying Doctors (1986–1991)
 Rage (1987–present)
 The Comedy Company (1988–1990)
 Home and Away (1988–present)
 Family Feud (1988–1996)
 Fast Forward (1989–1994)
 Til Ten (1989–1991)
 G.P. (1989–1996)

1990s
 Australia's Funniest Home Video Show'' (1990–2000, 2000–2004, 2005–2007)

Ending this year

Returning this year

TV movies

See also
 1990 in Australia
 List of Australian films of 1990

References